Andrea Favilli may refer to:

 Andrea Favilli (sculptor) (born 1963), American sculptor
 Andrea Favilli (footballer) (born 1997), Italian footballer